, real name  (10 May 1933 – 9 March 2023 as , was a Japanese actress and politician. During her 30-year-long political career, she served in some important posts. She became the first female President of the House of Councillors in 2004.

Her pseudonymous surname is also spelled Ogi, Ōgi and Ohgi for a variety of Hepburn romanization systems. She herself used Oogi.

Early life 
Oogi was born and brought up in Kobe, Hyogo. She survived the Kobe Air Raid at age 11. She wrote later that her experience of the air raid had convinced her to make efforts to attain peace and national defense.

Stage career 
Oogi graduated from Takarazuka Music School and joined the Takarazuka Revue in April 1954. Her first movie appearance was in October of that year. She retired from the revue in 1958 and married Kotaro Hayashi, a kabuki actor later known as Tojuro Sakata.

Oogi had been a full-time homemaker for a year until she returned to work in a television drama on 29 October 1959, and later appeared on many television dramas and variety shows. She also hosted a popular tabloid show Sanji no Anata from 1971 to 1977. One of her co-hosts was Yoshiko Ōtaka, who was elected to the House of Councillors in 1974.

Political career 
Strenuously lobbied to run by Takeo Fukuda, Oogi first elected to the House of Councillors as a member of the Liberal Democratic Party in 1977. She was voted out in 1989, but elected again in 1993. The following year she left the LDP and joined the Japan Renewal Party, which merged into the New Frontier Party on 10 December 1994. The NFP torn up on 31 December 1997, Oogi became a member of the Liberal Party, stringing along with Ichirō Ozawa.

It was in 2000 that Oogi came to the forefront. She founded the Conservative Party, renamed the New Conservative Party soon, and became its first leader in April. Prime Minister of Japan Yoshiro Mori appointed Oogi as Minister of Construction and Director General of the National Land Agency in July, and also as Minister of Transportation and Director General of Hokkaido Development Agency in December. When these ministries and agencies merged into the Ministry of Land, Infrastructure and Transport as a result of the administrative reform of 2001, Oogi was installed as its first minister. She drew the nameboard displayed at the entrance of the building of the ministry with black ink and a brush.

The New Conservative Party's debacle at the House of Councillors election in July 2001 heightened calls among party members for a change in leadership. Oogi resigned as party leader and was succeeded by Takeshi Noda on 17 September 2001.

Oogi joined the Liberal Democratic Party in 2003 again. She was installed as the 26th President of the House of Councillors on 30 July 2004. She attended at the World Conference of Speakers of Parliaments held by the Inter-Parliamentary Union in September 2005. In October 2006 she made an official visit to China.

In May 2007, Oogi announced her retirement from politics in July so that she could lead an ordinary life with her family. Her term of office expired on 28 July 2007.

Political views

Constitution 
Oogi has critical views against the Constitution of Japan of 1947. She has said that the constitution has many problems such as ignoring environmental rights, obfuscating the Self-Defense Forces and its international contribution to keep peace, and excessively protecting criminals while making light of crime victims' human rights. She also made a controversial remark: "The Constitution of Japan deprived Japanese women of their graces of character."

Transfer of capital functions 
A suggestion to transfer some capital functions out of Tokyo came under review in 1990s to solve the problem posed by the overconcentration of people in Tokyo. Oogi, who was the Minister of Construction in charge of this issue, expressed opposition to the transfer in September 2000. Her opposition created conflicts with Prime Minister Mori and with the mayors of the candidate cities.

Imperial succession 
Upon Prince Hisahito's birth in September 2006, Oogi suggested that the lawmakers take a cautious attitude toward the Government's move to allow female and matrilineal succession of the Imperial Throne. She appreciated Princess Akishino for her third deliverance in this day of declining birthrate and said "We women would like to look to her as a model."

Haneda Airport 
In 2000, Oogi proposed that Haneda Airport expand international air service. Narita Airport, which almost monopolized international flight service to Tokyo, is so distant from central Tokyo that there has long been a strong call among Tokyoites and Yokohamans for international air service of Haneda Airport. Oogi's proposal was welcomed by Shintaro Ishihara, Governor of Tokyo.

Personal life and death 
Oogi had two sons, Tomotaro and Hirotaro. Both of them are kabuki actors, following in their father's path. She had long hoped to have daughters or granddaughters possibly to be a Takarazuka actress.

Oogi's husband was notorious as a womanizer, as he admitted. Interviewed about his love affair with a maiko, which was exposed in a tabloid magazine in 2002, Oogi answered "I know that girl. She is intelligent and I favor her too," adding "A husband not attractive to women would be boring."

Oogi died of oesophageal cancer in Tokyo, on 9 March 2023, at the age of 89.

Honours 
 Grand Cordon of the Order of the Rising Sun, 2003.  
 Order of Brilliant Star with Special Grand Cordon, 2008.  
 Grand Cordon of the Order of the Paulownia Flowers, 2010.

Filmography 
 Kaiketsutaka Series, 1954
 Onna no Gakkō, 1955
 Hatsukoi Waltz, 1955
 Shirai Gonpachi, 1956
 Shippū! Kurama Tengu, 1956
 Hakoiri Musume to Bantō, 1956
 Koi sugata kitsune goten (恋すがた狐御殿) (1956)
 Otoko no Hanamichi, 1956
 Ujō, 1957
 Bibō no Miyako, 1957
 A Teapicker's Song of Goodbye, 1957
 A Farewell to the Woman Called My Sister, 1957
 Hanayome wa Matteiru, 1957
 Seishun Kōro, 1957
 A Holiday in Tokyo, 1958
 Salaryman Shusse Taikōki, 1958
 Mikkokusha wa Dare ka, 1958
 Sanroku, 1962
 Mujō Hijō, 1968
 Profound Desires of the Gods, 1968

See also 
 Takako Doi – The first female Speaker of the House of Representatives (1993–1996)
 Tamao Nakamura – Oogi's sister-in-law
 Shintaro Katsu – Oogi's brother-in-law
 Hisayasu Nagata
 Junichiro Koizumi
 List of members of the Diet of Japan
 List of the first female holders of political offices

References 

 Chikage Oogi, Ketsudan no Toki, Sekaibunkasha, 2007, 
 Kyoko Shimazaki, Kono Kuni de Onna de Aru to Iu Koto, Kyoiku Shiryo Shuppankai, 2001, 
 Yomiuri Shimbun Morning Edition, 28 July 2007

External links 

 
 
 Minister of Land, Infrastructure and Transport - Introduction by the Cabinet

1933 births
2023 deaths 
Deaths from cancer in Japan 
Deaths from esophageal cancer
Ministers of Land, Infrastructure, Transport and Tourism of Japan
Ministers of Construction of Japan
Ministers of Transport of Japan
Members of the House of Councillors (Japan)
Women government ministers of Japan
Female members of the House of Councillors (Japan)
Japanese actresses
Japanese actor-politicians
People from Kobe
Liberal Democratic Party (Japan) politicians
New Conservative Party (Japan) politicians
Japan Renewal Party politicians
New Frontier Party (Japan) politicians
20th-century Japanese politicians
20th-century Japanese women politicians
21st-century Japanese politicians
21st-century Japanese women politicians
Recipients of the Order of the Rising Sun
Recipients of the Order of Brilliant Star
Presidents of the House of Councillors (Japan)